William Yale Giles (born September 7, 1934) is the honorary National League (NL) President, and chairman emeritus and former part-owner of Major League Baseball (MLB)'s Philadelphia Phillies.

Early career
Giles is the son of Baseball Hall of Fame executive Warren C. Giles, who was the general manager and president of the Cincinnati Reds (1937–1951) before becoming president of the National League (1951–1969). Bill Giles was born in Rochester, New York, during his father's term as president of Rochester Red Wings of the International League.

His baseball career began in the Cincinnati organization during the 1950s, and he was among a group of Reds' executives (including former Cincinnati general manager Gabe Paul and MLB executive Tal Smith) who helped to found the Houston Astros when they debuted as the Colt .45s in 1962. Sporting News''' 1962 Official Baseball Guide and Record Book, published in the Colt .45s' maiden season, lists Giles as the club's traveling secretary and publicity director. Subsequently, he became promotions director, and focused on that role after the renamed team moved into the Astrodome in 1965.

Philadelphia Phillies

Giles started with the Phillies as the vice president of business operations in 1969.  He worked his way up in the organization, with stops as executive vice president and president, before becoming the chairman in 1997. He was succeeded as chairman by David Montgomery and became chairman emeritus in 2015.

Giles was also part of the ownership group that bought the Phillies from the Carpenter  family in 1981.  The group was composed of Giles, Claire S. Betz, Tri-Play Associates (Alexander K. Buck, J. Mahlon Buck Jr. and William C. Buck), and Double Play Inc. (John S. Middleton).  Mahlon Buck died in 2011. Claire S. Betz died in 2014. The group reportedly purchased the team for $30 million. In March 2015, the team was valued at over $1 billion.

Around 2012 or 2013, Giles sold his last shares of the Phillies.

National League honorary president
Giles is also honorary president of the National League—the same job his father held on an official full-time basis. One of the honorary president's tasks is to present the Warren C. Giles Trophy, named after his father, to the National League Championship Series winner.

Other duties of the honorary league president include representing the league at the All-Star Game and the postseason.

Honors and awards
In 2001, a new tournament for the Division II baseball teams in the Philadelphia area, the Bill Giles Invitational, was named in his honor.

Personal
His wife, Nancy, died on April 12, 2020.

See also

Phillie Phanatic

BibliographyPouring Six Beers at a Time: And Other Stories from a Lifetime in Baseball''

References

External links
Bill Giles at Baseball America Executive Database
Bill Giles Phillies Front Office
Bill Giles: Baseball in Giles family bloodlines"

1934 births
Living people
American sports businesspeople
Denison Big Red men's tennis players 
Major League Baseball executives
Major League Baseball owners
Major League Baseball general managers
Major League Baseball team presidents
Philadelphia Phillies executives
Philadelphia Phillies owners